The Maratha invasions of Bengal (1741-1751), also known as the Maratha expeditions in Bengal, refers to the frequent invasions by the Maratha invaders in the Bengal Subah (Bengal, Bihar, parts of modern Orissa), after their successful campaign in the Carnatic region at the Battle of Trichinopoly. The leader of the expedition was Maratha Maharaja Raghoji Bhonsle of Nagpur. The Marathas invaded Bengal five times from August 1741 to May 1751, causing widespread economic losses in the Bengal Subah.

During their occupation, the Bargi mercenaries of the Marathas perpetrated massacres against the local population. According to one memoir, perhaps close to 400,000 Hindu people in western Bengal and Bihar were killed. Contemporary accounts of the invasions report mass gang rapes of women and children, and mutilation of victims, which included cutting off their hands and noses, by the Marathas. According to the Bengali text Maharashtra Purana, "Durga ordered her followers to be gracious to the Muslim Nawab and oppose the Marathas, because the evil-minded ones had killed Brahmans and Vaisnavas." The Marathas intended to establish their rule in western Bengal by attracting the local Hindu zamindars against the Muslim Nawab, but the atrocities against the Hindu population diminished the possibilities of such an alliance.

The Nawab of Bengal handed over Orissa and agreed to pay Rs. 1.2 million of chauth from the revenue of Bengal and Bihar, and the Marathas agreed not to invade Bengal again. The Nawab of Bengal also paid Rs. 3.2 million to the Marathas, towards the arrears of chauth for the preceding years. The chauth was paid annually by the Nawab of Bengal up to 1758, until the British occupation of Bengal.

Invasions of Bengal 

From 1741 to 1751, the Marathas under Raghuji Bhonsle invaded Bengal six times. The first one in 1741, as also the third in 1744, was led by Raghuji's general Pandit Bhaskar Ram Kolhatkar or Bhaskar Pandit. The second in 1742 and the fourth in 1745 were led by Raghuji himself. The fifth in 1747 and the sixth in 1748 were undertaken by Janoji and Sabaji respectively. These invasions caused heavy destruction in the armies of the Nawab of Bengal. Nawab Alivardi Khan was successful in repelling all the invasions. In 1743 two Maratha Armies invaded - one belonged to Raghuji Bhosle, the other to Balaji Rao. Alivardi Khan was obliged to pay him a subsidy, promising to pay him Chauth tax. The continuous conflict took a heavy toll on the population of Bengal.

First invasion (1741) 

After the inauguration of Alivardi Khan as the Nawab of Bengal, the provincial governor of Orissa, Lutfullah Tabrizi Rustam Jung, more commonly known as Murshid Quli II, revolted against him. The revolt was crushed by Alivardi in March 1741, but Murshid Quli II escaped with his family and took shelter of Raghuji Bhonsle, the Maratha ruler of Nagpur. Raghuji agreed to assist Murshid Quli II in regaining Orissa. Murshid Quli II's son-in-law Mirza Baker, assisted by Maratha troops and the rebel forces of Orissa (who were dissatisfied with the governor of Orissa), invaded Orissa in August 1741. Orissa's governor, Syed Ahmed Khan (a nephew of Alivardi Khan), was defeated and captured along with his family.

Hearing of this, Alivardi rushed to Orissa and Alivardi's commander Mir Jafar freed Syed Ahmed and his family. Alivardi regained control of Orissa and returned to Murshidabad. The Marathas retook Orissa in 1749.

Bargi atrocities 

The Hindu Maratha warriors invaded and occupied western Bengal up to the Hooghly River. During that period of invasion by the Marathas, warriors called as "Bargis", perpetrated atrocities against the local Hindu Bengalis. As reported in Burdwan Kingdom's and European sources, the Bargis are said to have plundered villages. The resulting casualties of Bargi onslaught against in Bengal are considered to be among the deadliest massacres in Indian history. According to the 18th-century Bengali text Maharashtra Purana written by Gangaram:

According to the Bengali text Maharashtra Purana:

The Bargi atrocities were corroborated by contemporary Dutch and British accounts. Jan Kersseboom, chief of the Dutch East India Company factory in Bengal, estimated that perhaps around 400,000 people in Bihar and western Bengal were killed in the raids by the Bargis. This devastated Bengal's economy, as many of the people killed included merchants, textile weavers, silk winders, and mulberry cultivators. The Cossimbazar factory reported in 1742, for example, that the Bargis burnt down many houses along with weavers' looms.

British writer Robert Orme reported that the Marathas caused so much distress to the local population that many of them "were continually taking flight" in large numbers to Calcutta whenever they heard rumours of the Marathas coming. Many people in western Bengal also fled to take shelter in East Bengal, fearing for their lives in the wake of the Maratha attacks.

End of hostilities 

In 1751, the Marathas signed a peace treaty with the Nawab of Bengal.  The territories beyond the Subarnarekha River were now ceded to the Marathas, according to which, Mir Habib (a former courtier of Alivardi Khan, who had defected to the Marathas) was made provincial governor of Orissa under nominal control of the Nawab of Bengal. It made The Nawab of Bengal a tributary to the Marathas who agreed to pay Rs. 1.2 million annually as the chauth of Bengal and Bihar, and the Marathas agreed not to invade Bengal again. The Nawab of Bengal also paid Rs. 3.2 million to the Marathas, towards the arrears of chauth for the preceding years.

The chauth was paid annually by the Nawab of Bengal up to 1758, until the East India Company seized control of Bengal.

References

 Marathas in Bengal

Battles involving the Maratha Empire
Battles involving the Mughal Empire
Bengal Subah